Greg Butler may refer to:
Greg Butler (basketball), American basketball player
Greg Butler (swimmer), English swimmer
Greg Butler (visual effects supervisor), American visual effects supervisor

See also
Gregg Butler, gridiron football player